Jello is an end-to-end Java application framework optimized for Google App Engine including comprehensive Data Authorization model, a powerful RESTful engine, and out-of-the-box UI views. Jello's REST offers a clean, and simple to follow, JSON format. Its protocol schema follows the OData specification.

Overview 
The following components are part of Jello Framework:
 Data Model: Jello uses JDO (Java Data Objects) as the underlying ORM layer to map Jello Entities to the database.
 Data Access Control: One of Jello's key features is its inline Authorization Model. With Jello you can assign different access levels for data elements at any resolution (Namespaces, Entities, Fields, Actions) and specify who is authorized to access the data via the REST API.
 RESTful API 
 Admin UI views

References

External links 
 Developer Guide
 Getting started with Jello
 Jello Tutorials & Code Examples
 Jello RESTful Web Services API 
 Jello Entity Definition
 Jello Authorization Model

Java enterprise platform
Web service specifications